The 2020 Merrimack Warriors football team represented Merrimack College in the 2020–21 NCAA Division I FCS football season. They were led by eighth-year head coach Dan Curran and played their home games at Duane Stadium. They competed as members of the Northeast Conference.

Previous season

The Warriors finished the 2019 season with a record of 6–5. They did not play a full conference schedule due to their transition to Division I, but went 1–3 against Northeast Conference opponents.

Schedule
Merrimack's schedule was released on April 9, 2020. The Warriors had games scheduled against Holy Cross (September 5), New Hampshire (October 3), Presbyterian (November 14), and James Madison (November 21), but these games were canceled before the season started due to the COVID-19 pandemic.

References

Merrimack
Merrimack Warriors football seasons
Merrimack Warriors football
College football winless seasons